The M61 is a motorway in North West England between Manchester and Preston, linking the M60 Manchester orbital motorway with the M6 motorway. 

It runs from the A580 near Wardley and heads northwest past Bolton, Horwich and Chorley to join the M6 near Bamber Bridge, just north of the junction between the M6 and M65. It runs parallel to the A6, to its northeast, for the entirety of its length, essentially bypassing the towns and villages the A6 runs through between Manchester and Preston.

History
The Horwich to Worsley section began on Wednesday 1 January 1969, costing £12.4million, to open by the end of December 1970, built by the Alfred McAlpine and Leonard Fairclough & Son consortium.

Services

The M61 has one service station: Rivington services (formerly Anderton Services and Bolton West services), located between junctions 6 and 8 (as junction 7 was never built). This motorway service area was used in the filming of The Services, a pilot episode for the Farnworth-born comedian Peter Kay series That Peter Kay Thing, a spoof documentary of a day in the life of the services staff.

Originally built as part of the Kenning Motor Group, it later became part of the Rank Group portfolio, before passing on to Pavilion (Granada) and First Motorway Services. This services originally had two restaurants (one each side) and full facilities. However, due to the relatively short length of the M61 and wealth of alternative nearby facilities, it suffered from low traffic and footfall. This resulted in a lack of investment, and the site passed from hand to hand. It was also, at various times, operated on one side only, access from the opposite carriageway being via the over-bridge, or closed down completely. 
In 2009, it was acquired by the Blackburn based Euro Garages Group. Instead of simply refurbishing the existing infrastructure, a completely new facility was built on each of the old car-parks. All the original buildings were then demolished.

At various periods, since the building of the M61, the lack of a junction 7 has been used by local politicians as a campaign feature. This has once again come to the fore in 2022, as a proposal to relieve major congestion between junction 6 and Horwich. The two proposals are; to either build junction 7 where the M61 passes over the Bolton to Chorley road at Anderton, or to incorporate junction 7 into the Rivington Services site. Short term, neither are likely to happen.

Worsley Braided Interchange 

At the southeastern end at junction 2, the Worsley Braided Interchange, a stretch of the road on Linnyshaw Moss, earns a place in the Guinness Book of World Records for having the most traffic lanes side by side (17), spread across eight almost-parallel carriageways, in a "basketweave interchange" design. However it isn't clear how many of the lanes belong to the A666(M).  The carriageways cross each other at shallow angles and make use of tunnel-like structures to spread the load, avoiding the need for skew bridges.

Spurs of the M61 radiate from junction 2 to four surrounding junctions, effectively creating one large interchange, consisting of the following junctions:
 The Kearsley Interchange links the A666 and A6053 to M61 junctions 2 and 3.
 M61 junction 3 links the M61 southeastbound to the Kearsley Interchange.
 M61 junction 2 (Worsley Braided Interchange) links to all of the other junctions.
 M60 junction 15 (Swinton Interchange) links the M60 to M61 junction 2 by using a short stretch of the A666(M).
 M60 junction 14 (Wardley Interchange) links the A580 East (East Lancashire Road) to M61 junction 2, and separately links the A580 West to the M60 East at junction 15.
 
The name "Worsley Braided Interchange" may also be used to describe the entire complex of five junctions. On its opening on 17 December 1970, the complex was already known locally as "Spaghetti Junction", 17 months before the opening of Gravelly Hill Interchange in Birmingham, nowadays most associated with that name in Britain, but the name did not persist.

Lancaster Canal
The construction of the motorway between junctions 8 and 9 caused part of Lancaster Canal to be closed. Before closure, the canal had a southern section that had always been isolated from the main northern section, but historically linked to it by a horse-drawn tramway, the Lancaster Canal Tramroad. The new motorway crossed the route of the canal at three points. The Ministry of Transport and British Waterways Board decided that the cost of constructing three bridges was not justified, particularly as the canal was in poor condition, and promoted a bill in Parliament for closure of this section of the canal. The southernmost part of this section remains and is now classified as a spur of the Leeds and Liverpool Canal.

Junctions
{| class="plainrowheaders wikitable"
|-
!scope=col|County
!scope=col|Location
!scope=col|
!scope=col|
!scope=col|Junction
!scope=col|Name
!scope=col|Destinations
!scope=col|Notes
|-

Mileages are calculated using the A580 spur, the longer of the two spurs at the Manchester end.

Coordinate list

Notes

References

External links

 CBRD Motorway Database – M61
Lancashire County Council – Historic Highways – M61
 The Motorway Archive – M61

Motorways in England
Roads in Lancashire
Roads in Greater Manchester